Noel Mobio Yobou Agbo (born 5 January 1982 in Attécoubé) is a goalkeeper currently playing for Platinum Stars F.C.

Career 
He began his career with Stella Club d'Adjamé, was promoted in 2002, before transferred to Thanda Royal Zulu in 2006.

The former Benoni Premier United goalkeeper Yobou has finally found a new home at National First Division side FC Cape Town, four months after declaring that he has quit relegated Western Province United. He recently signed a two and half year deal with the Tycoons from the North-West Province Platinum Stars F.C.

International career 
Yobou presented the Under 23 from The Elephants at Football at the 2004 Summer Olympics Qualify and was the captain.

See also
Football in Ivory Coast
List of football clubs in Ivory Coast

References

1982 births
Living people
Ivorian footballers
Ivory Coast international footballers
Expatriate soccer players in South Africa
Association football goalkeepers
Ivorian expatriates in South Africa
F.C. Cape Town players
Stella Club d'Adjamé players
Footballers from Abidjan